Ron Lynch may refer to:
Ron Lynch (cricketer) (1923-2012), English cricketer
Ron Lynch (American football) (born 1940), American football coach
Ron Lynch (comedian) (born 1951), American stand-up comedian and actor
Ron Lynch (rugby league), Australian rugby league footballer